Halomonas anticariensis is a bacterium. It is strictly aerobic and because of its production of exopolysaccharides forms cream-coloured, mucoid colonies. FP35T (=LMG 22089T =CECT 5854T) is the type strain. Its genome has been sequenced.

References

Further reading
Tahrioui, Ali. Mecanismos de comunicación intercelular en Halomonas anticariensis. Universidad de Granada, 2013.

External links

LPSN
Type strain of Halomonas anticariensis at BacDive -  the Bacterial Diversity Metadatabase

Oceanospirillales
Bacteria described in 2004